Arab Studies Quarterly (ASQ) is an English-language academic journal devoted to Arabist studies. It was established in 1979 by the late Professors Edward Said and Ibrahim Abu-Lughod. They envisioned the journal to be a platform for academic research to counter anti-Arab propaganda veiled by academic jargon. Since its inception, ASQ has been a refereed academic journal that publishes articles on the Arabs, their history and social and political institutions.
  
Articles appearing in this journal are indexed in the PAIS Bulletin and are annotated and indexed in Historical Abstracts; International Political Science Abstracts; America: History and Life; Political Science Abstracts; Periodica Islamica, and Index of Islamic Literature.

The current editor of the journal is Ibrahim Aoude of the University of Hawaii.

See also
Samih Farsoun, president of the Association of Arab American University Graduates
Journal of Palestine Studies
Jerusalem Quarterly
Jamal Nassar, ASQ editor, 1991–95

References

External links
 Arab Studies Quarterly.
Current and previous issues of Arab Studies Quarterly (ASQ).  
articles, "Most Recent Articles from Arab Studies Quarterly (ASQ)".

Middle Eastern studies in the United States
Publications established in 1979
Quarterly journals
English-language journals
Middle Eastern studies journals
Arab studies